Tatyana Boyko (nee Shlyakhto; born 24 November 1955) is a Belarusian athlete and a judge of the Constitutional Court of Belarus. She competed in the women's high jump at the 1976 Summer Olympics, representing the Soviet Union.

She graduated from the law faculty of the Belarusian State University in 1981 and became a Constitutional Court judge in 1997.

After the 2020 Belarusian protests, she was banned from entering the Baltic states.

References

External links
 

1955 births
Living people
Sportspeople from Vitebsk
Athletes (track and field) at the 1976 Summer Olympics
Belarusian female high jumpers
Olympic athletes of the Soviet Union
Place of birth missing (living people)
Soviet female high jumpers
Belarusian judges
Universiade medalists in athletics (track and field)
Universiade bronze medalists for the Soviet Union